Davids Island is a member of the Arctic Archipelago in the Qikiqtaaluk Region, Nunavut. It is an irregularly shaped Baffin Island offshore island, located in Admiralty Inlet, at the mouth of Fleming Inlet (to its north) and Fabricius Fiord (to its northeast).

External links 
 Davids Island (Nunavut) in the Atlas of Canada - Toporama; Natural Resources Canada

Islands of Baffin Island
Uninhabited islands of Qikiqtaaluk Region